

Incumbent
 President
 Kolinda Grabar-Kitarović (until February 18)
 Zoran Milanović (from February 19)
 Prime Minister – Andrej Plenković

Events
Ongoing – COVID-19 pandemic in Croatia

January 
 January 1 – Croatia assumed the presidency of the Council of the European Union.
January 5 – Former prime minister Zoran Milanović defeated president Kolinda Grabar-Kitarović in the second round of the presidential election with 53% of the vote.
 January 26 – Croatia men's national handball team finished second at the 2020 European Men's Handball Championship after a 22-20 loss to Spain in the final.

February 
February 18 – Zoran Milanović was inaugurated as the fifth President of Croatia.
February 25 – The first case of COVID-19 in the country was confirmed.

March 
March 12 – The Croatian Football Federation suspended all football leagues in the country.
March 13 – All classes in schools and universities were suspended, effective March 16.
March 21 – All public transport in the country was suspended.
March 22 – Zagreb was hit by a strong earthquake, killing a person, wounding 26 others, and damaging several structures.

April 
April 14 – The number of active COVID-19 cases reached a peak of 1,258.
April 24 – The number of recorded COVID-19 cases surpassed 2,000.

May 
May 18 – The 9th Croatian Parliament dissolved itself.

June 
June 21 – Adria Tour final in Zadar is cancelled after Grigor Dimitrov tested positive for COVID-19. Within a week, other participants of the Zadar event including Borna Ćorić, Viktor Troicki, Novak Djokovic and Goran Ivanišević tested positive too.

July 
July 5 – Parliamentary elections were held.
July 10 – The country joined the European Exchange Rate Mechanism.

September 
September 10 – Mate Pavić and Bruno Soares win the US Open Men's Doubles title.

October 
 October 12 – 2020 Zagreb shooting.

December 
 December 20 – Croatia women's national handball team finished third at the 2020 European Women's Handball Championship, winning the bronze medal, first-ever medal in Croatian women's handball history.
 December 27 – COVID-19 vaccination begins.
 December 28 – Sisak-Moslavina County was hit by a strong earthquake, with damage being reported.
December 29 – 2020 Petrinja earthquake. Seven people killed and 26 injured.

Deaths

January 
 January 1 – Damir Mihanović, comedian and musician (b. 1961).
January 4 – Zdravko Tomac, politician and writer (b. 1937).
January 21 – Zlatko Mesić, footballer (b. 1946).
January 24 – Duje Bonačić, rower (b. 1929).

February 
 February 15 – Vatroslav Mimica, film director (b. 1923).

March 
 March 3 – Božidar Alić, actor (b. 1954).
March 7 – Veronika Durbešić, actress (b. 1945).
March 8 – Zdenka Vučković, singer (b. 1942).
March 23 – Branko Cikatić, heavyweight kickboxer (b. 1955).

May 
 May 21 – Bekim Sejranović, writer (b. 1972).

June 
 June 20 – Ema Derossi-Bjelajac, communist politician (b. 1926).
 June 30 – Ivo Banac, historian (b. 1947).

August 
 August 4 – Rajko Dujmić, musician and composer (b. 1954).
August 11 – Tonko Maroević, poet, writer and academic (b. 1941).
August 15 – Josip Kregar, sociologist, jurist and politician (b. 1953).

September 
September 5 – Žarko Domljan, politician (b. 1932).

October 
October 18 – Orlando Rivetti, sports journalist (b. 1951).
October 25 – Slaven Letica, sociologist, politician and university professor (b. 1940).
October 26 – Jean-Jacques Roskam, rock guitarist (b. 1954).
October 29 – Slaven Zambata, footballer (b. 1940).

November 
November 2 – Mladen Kušec, poet, narrator, publicist and journalist (b. 1938).
November 7 — Vera Zima, actress (b. 1953).
November 11 – Anđelka Martić, writer and translator (b. 1924).
November 12 – Krasnodar Rora, footballer (b. 1945).
November 13 – Krunoslav Kićo Slabinac, folk singer (b. 1944).
November 15 – Ivan Kožarić, artist (b. 1921).
November 15 – Anto Kovačević, politician, publicist and philosopher (b. 1952).
November 16 – Tomislav Merčep, convicted war criminal (b. 1952).
November 22 – Mustafa Nadarević, actor (b. 1943).
November 27 – Špiro Guberina, actor (b. 1933).
November 28 – Vera Tomašek, journalist and editor (b. 1958).

December 
December 1 – Lazo Goluža, editor, quiz author and translator (b. 1936).
December 11 – Đurđa Ivezić, actress (b. 1936).
December 13 – Otto Barić, football player and manager (b. 1933).
December 18 – Vojmir Kačić, football manager (b. 1934).
December 23 – Pero Kvrgić, actor (b. 1927).
December 26 – Milka Babović, sprint and hurdles runner, and later sports journalist (b. 1928).

See also 
 Timeline of the COVID-19 pandemic in Croatia
 List of years in Croatia
 2020 in Croatia

References

External links
 

 
2020s in Croatia
Years of the 21st century in Croatia
Croatia
Croatia